Rulyrana saxiscandens is a species of frog in the family Centrolenidae. It is endemic to the Cordillera Escalera, Peru, approximately between the cities of Tarapoto and Moyobamba.

Taxonomy and nomenclature
The delimitation of this species underwent a major change in 2014 when Rulyrana saxiscandens (originally Cochranella saxiscandens), Cochranella tangarana and Cochranella croceopodes were found to represent the same species. All three species were described in the same paper, so none of them have priority. Using the Principle of the First Reviser, Evan Twomey and colleagues chose C. tangarana and C. croceopodes as junior synonyms of Rulyrana saxiscandens.

Habitat
It does not occur in heavily modified habitats but can occur in secondary forests.

References

saxiscandens
Amphibians of Peru
Endemic fauna of Peru
Amphibians described in 1993
Taxa named by William Edward Duellman
Taxonomy articles created by Polbot